Cuisine of Chinese Muslims (Dungan: Чыңжән цаы or , Dungan: Ҳуэйзў цаы) is the cuisine of the Hui (ethnic Chinese Muslims) and other Muslims living in China such as Bonan, Dongxiang, Salar and Uyghurs as well as Dungans of Central Asia.

While it does have distinctive dishes like clear-broth beef noodle soup and chuanr,  Chinese Islamic cuisine typically consists of variations on regionally popular foods that are typical of Han Chinese cuisine, in particular to make them halal. Additionally, it borrows ingredients from Middle Eastern, Turkic, and South Asian cuisines, notably the heavy use of mutton and spices. Finally, typical of “northern” Chinese food, Chinese Islamic cuisine almost exclusively uses wheat noodles as the staple, to the near complete exclusion of rice. While these variations are typically minor for each dish, they together add up to create a very distinctive cuisine.

History
Due to the large Muslim population in Western China, many Chinese restaurants cater to or are run by Muslims. Northern Chinese Islamic cuisine originated in China proper. It is heavily influenced by Beijing cuisine, with nearly all cooking methods identical and differs only in material due to religious restrictions. As a result, northern Islamic cuisine is often included in home Beijing cuisine though seldom in east coast restaurants.

During the Yuan dynasty, halal and kosher methods of slaughtering animals and preparing food was banned and forbidden by the Mongol emperors, starting with Genghis Khan who banned Muslims and Jews from slaughtering their animals their own way and made them follow the Mongol method.

Among all the [subject] alien peoples only the Hui-hui say “we do not eat Mongol food”. [Cinggis Qa’an replied:] “By the aid of heaven we have pacified you; you are our slaves. Yet you do not eat our food or drink. How can this be right?” He thereupon made them eat. “If you slaughter sheep, you will be considered guilty of a crime.” He issued a regulation to that effect ... [In 1279/1280 under Qubilai] all the Muslims say: “if someone else slaughters [the animal] we do not eat”. Because the poor people are upset by this, from now on, Musuluman [Muslim] Huihui and Zhuhu [Jewish] Huihui, no matter who kills [the animal] will eat [it] and must cease slaughtering sheep themselves, and cease the rite of circumcision.

Traditionally, there is a distinction between Northern and Southern Chinese Islamic cuisine despite both using lamb and mutton. Northern Chinese Islamic cuisine relies heavily on beef, but rarely ducks, geese, shrimp or seafood, while southern Islamic cuisine is the reverse. The reason for this difference is due to availability of the ingredients. Oxen have been long used for farming and Chinese governments have frequently strictly prohibited the slaughter of oxen for food. However, due to the geographic proximity of the northern part of China to minority-dominated regions that were not subjected to such restrictions, beef could be easily purchased and transported to Northern China. At the same time, ducks, geese and shrimp are rare in comparison to Southern China due to the arid climate of Northern China.

A Chinese Islamic restaurant can be similar to a Mandarin restaurant with the exception that there is no pork on the menu and the dishes are primarily noodle/soup based.

In most major eastern cities in China, there are very limited Islamic/Halal restaurants, which are typically run by migrants from Western China (e.g., Uyghurs). They primarily offer inexpensive noodle soups only. These restaurants are typically decorated with Islamic motifs such as pictures of Islamic rugs and Arabic writing.

Another difference is that lamb and mutton dishes are more commonly available than in other Chinese restaurants, due to the greater prevalence of these meats in the cuisine of Western Chinese regions. (Refer to image 1.)

Other Muslim ethnic minorities like the Bonan, Dongxiang, Salar and Tibetan Muslims have their own cuisines as well. Dongxiang people operate their own restaurants serving their cuisine.

Many cafeterias (canteens) at Chinese universities have separate sections or dining areas for Muslim students (Hui or Western Chinese minorities), typically labeled "qingzhen." Student ID cards sometimes indicate whether a student is Muslim and will allow access to these dining areas or will allow access on special occasions such as the Eid feast following Ramadan.

Several Hui restaurants serving Chinese Islamic cuisine exist in Los Angeles. San Francisco, despite its huge number of Chinese restaurants, appears to have only one whose cuisine would qualify as halal.

Many Chinese Hui Muslims who moved from Yunnan to Burma (Myanmar) are known as Panthays operate restaurants and stalls serving Chinese Islamic cuisine such as noodles. Chinese Hui Muslims from Yunnan who moved to Thailand are known as Chin Haw and they also own restaurants and stalls serving Chinese Islamic food.

In Central Asia, Dungan people, descendants of Hui, operate restaurants serving Chinese Islamic cuisine which is respectively referred to as Dungan cuisine there. They cater to Chinese businessmen. Chopsticks are used by Dungans. The cuisine of the Dungan resembles northwestern Chinese cuisine.

Most Chinese regard Hui halal food as cleaner than food made by non-Muslims so their restaurants are popular in China. Hui who migrated to Northeast China (Manchuria) after the Chuang Guandong opened many new inns and restaurants to cater to travelers, which were regarded as clean.

The Hui who migrated to Taiwan operate Qingzhen restaurants and stalls serving Chinese Islamic cuisine in Taipei and other big cities.

The Thai Department of Export Promotion claims that "China's halal food producers are small-scale entrepreneurs whose products have little value added and lack branding and technology to push their goods to international standards" to encourage Thai private sector halal producers to market their products in China.

A 1903 started franchise which serves Muslim food is Dong Lai Shun in Hankou.

400 meters have to be kept as a distance from each restaurant serving beef noodles to another of its type if they belong to Hui Muslims, since Hui have a pact between each other in Ningxia, Gansu and Shaanxi.

Halal restaurants are checked up upon by clerics from mosques.

Halal food manufacture has been sanctioned by the government of the Ningxia Autonomous Region.

Famous dishes

Lamian

Lamian (Dungan: Ламян) is a Chinese dish of hand-made noodles, usually served in a beef or mutton-flavored soup (湯麪, даңмян, tāngmiàn), but sometimes stir-fried (炒麪, Чаомян, chǎomiàn) and served with a tomato-based sauce. Literally, 拉, ла (lā) means to pull or stretch, while 麪, мян (miàn) means noodle. The hand-making process involves taking a lump of dough and repeatedly stretching it to produce a single very long noodle.

Words that begin with L are not native to Turkic — läghmän is a loanword as stated by Uyghur linguist Abdlikim: It is of Chinese derivation and not originally Uyghur.

Beef noodle soup

Beef noodle soup is a noodle soup dish composed of stewed beef, beef broth, vegetables and wheat noodles. It exists in various forms throughout East and Southeast Asia. It was created by the Hui people during the Qing dynasty of China.

In the west, this food may be served in a small portion as a soup. In China, a large bowl of it is often taken as a whole meal with or without any side dish.

Chuanr

Chuanr (Chinese: 串儿, Dungan: Чўанр, Pinyin: chuànr (shortened from "chuan er"), "kebab"), originating in the Xinjiang (新疆) province of China and in recent years has been disseminated throughout the rest of that country, most notably in Beijing. It is a product of the Chinese Islamic cuisine of the Uyghur (维吾尔) people and other Chinese Muslims. Yang rou chuan or lamb kebabs, is particularly popular.

Suan cai

Suan cai is a traditional fermented vegetable dish, similar to Korean kimchi and German sauerkraut, used in a variety of ways. It consists of pickled Chinese cabbage. Suan cai is a unique form of pao cai due to the material used and the method of production. Although suan cai is not exclusive to Chinese Islamic cuisine, it is used in Chinese Islamic cuisine to top off noodle soups, especially beef noodle soup.

Nang
Nang (Chinese: 馕, Dungan: Нәң) is a type of round unleavened bread, topped with sesame. It is similar to South and Central Asia naan.

Image gallery

See also

 Chinese cuisine
 Islam in China
 Uyghur cuisine
 Dali City
 Gansu
 Kunming
 Lanzhou
 Ningxia
 Qinghai
 Shaanxi
 Xi'an
 Yunnan

References

External links

A San Francisco Chronicle article on a Chinese Islamic restaurant in the San Francisco Bay area
chinaheritagequarterly.org
The Famous Dungan Noodles or Lyu Mian with Eight Seasoning Dishes!
More pictures of the Dungan Cuisine

 
Regional cuisines of China
Islamic culture
Xinjiang
Multiculturalism and Islam